The Apostolic Nunciature to Suriname is an ecclesiastical office of the Catholic Church in Suriname. It is a diplomatic post of the Holy See, whose representative is called the Apostolic Nuncio with the rank of an ambassador. The nuncio resides in Port of Spain, Trinidad.

List of papal representatives to the Suriname
Apostolic Nuncios 
Eugenio Sbarbaro (13 July 1994 - 26 April 2000)
Emil Paul Tscherrig (20 January 2001 - 22 May 2004)
Thomas Edward Gullickson (15 December 2004 – 21 May 2011)
Nicola Girasoli (29 October 2011 – 16 June 2017)
Fortunatus Nwachukwu (9 March 2018 – 17 December 2021)
Santiago de Wit Guzmán (30 July 2022    – present)

See also
 Apostolic Delegation to the Antilles

References

 
Suriname
Holy See
Holy See–Suriname relations